The Moodys Branch Formation is a geologic formation in Georgia. It preserves fossils dating back to the Paleogene period.

See also
 List of fossiliferous stratigraphic units in Georgia (U.S. state)
 Paleontology in Georgia (U.S. state)

References

 

Paleogene Georgia (U.S. state)
Paleogene Alabama
Paleogene Louisiana
Paleogene Mississippi
Paleogene Florida